William Alexander Stewart (3 August 1884 – 16 April 1968) was an Australian rules footballer who played with St Kilda in the Victorian Football League (VFL).	Stewart also played for the Victorian team at the 1908 Melbourne Carnival, replacing an injured player. He played his last VFL game in a victory against Geelong, before transferring to Prahran in the Victorian Football Association. He would later also play for North Ballarat. Serving for Australia in World War I, he spent time as a Prisoner of war in Germany.

Notes

External links 

1884 births
1968 deaths
Australian rules footballers from Victoria (Australia)
St Kilda Football Club players
Prahran Football Club players
North Ballarat Football Club players
Australian prisoners of war
Australian military personnel of World War I
World War I prisoners of war held by Germany